Kildare Digby, 2nd Baron Digby (c. 1627 – 11 July 1661), was an Irish nobleman.

Kildare was a minor when he succeeded his father, Robert Digby, 1st Baron Digby, in 1642. Upon the English Restoration, he sat in the Irish House of Lords in the Parliament of 1661, and was appointed Governor of Kings County, like his father. However, he died at Dublin in July. By his wife Mary (d. 23 December 1692), the daughter of Robert Gardiner of London, he had four sons and three daughters: 
Hon. Robert Digby (22 April 1653 – 11 July 1653)
Hon. Elizabeth Digby, died young
Hon. Mary Digby, died young
Robert Digby, 3rd Baron Digby (1654–1677)
Simon Digby, 4th Baron Digby (1657–1685)
William Digby, 5th Baron Digby (1661–1752)
Hon. Lettice Digby, married Charles Cotes, of Woodcote Hall

He was buried at St Patrick's Cathedral, Dublin, and his widow and children afterwards lived at the Digby estate of Coleshill, Warwickshire, where she erected a monument to him.

References

1620s births
1661 deaths
Kildare
Kildare